Lilian Renaud (born 11 October 1991 in Mamirolle, département du Doubs, France) is a French singer who won the title in Season 4 of the French music competition The Voice: la plus belle voix broadcast on TF1 from 10 January 2015 to 25 April 2015.

Discography

Albums
 2015: Le bruit de l'aube
 2016: Le cœur qui cogne
 2019: Lilian Renaud
 2021: Dans un moment de bonheur

Singles
 2015: Promis juré
 2015: Il faudra vivre
 2015: Pour ne plus avoir peur
 2015: Si tu cherches de l'or
 2016: Savoir dire merci
 2016: Imagine
 2018: Les rêves (on repousse le vent)
 2019: On en verra encore
 2019: Quoi de plus beau
 2021: Who do you love
 2021: Combien d'airs

References

The Voice (franchise) winners
1991 births
Living people
21st-century French singers
21st-century French male singers